Charles Augustus Bennet, 5th Earl of Tankerville PC, DL (28 April 1776 – 25 June 1859), styled Lord Ossulston until 1822, was a British politician. He served as Treasurer of the Household from 1806 to 1807 in the Ministry of All the Talents.

Background and education
Lord Ossulston was the eldest son of Charles Bennet, 4th Earl of Tankerville, by his wife Emma Colebrooke, daughter of Sir James Colebrooke, 1st Baronet. Henry Grey Bennet was his younger brother. He was educated at Eton and Trinity College, Cambridge.

Political career
Lord Ossulston sat as Member of Parliament for Steyning from 1803 to 1806, for Knaresborough from 1806 to 1818 and for Berwick from 1820 to 1822. He served as Treasurer of the Household from 1806 to 1807 in the Ministry of All the Talents headed by Lord Grenville. He was sworn of the Privy Council in 1806. In 1822 he succeeded his father in the earldom and took his seat in the House of Lords.

Family

Lord Tankerville married a French woman, Corisande Armandine Sophie Léonie Hélène de Gramont, daughter of Antoine Louis Marie de Gramont, duc de Gramont, at Devonshire House, London, on 28 July 1806. They had two children, Charles Bennet, 6th Earl of Tankerville and Lady Corisande Emma Bennett, who married James Harris, 3rd Earl of Malmesbury. Lord Tankerville died in June 1859, aged 83, and was succeeded by his only son, Charles. The Countess of Tankerville died in January 1865.

References

External links 
 

|-

People educated at Eton College
Alumni of Trinity College, Cambridge
Deputy Lieutenants of Northumberland
Earls in the Peerage of Great Britain
Members of the Privy Council of the United Kingdom
Ossulston, Charles Bennet, Lord
Ossulston, Charles Bennet, Lord
Ossulston, Charles Bennet, Lord
Ossulston, Charles Bennet, Lord
Ossulston, Charles Bennet, Lord
Ossulston, Charles Bennet, Lord
UK MPs who inherited peerages
Ossulston, Charles Bennet, Lord
1776 births
1859 deaths
Treasurers of the Household